Kimberly Ann Barnes Arico (born August 9, 1970) is an American women's basketball coach, and the current head coach of the Michigan Wolverines women's basketball team. Previously, she was head coach of the St. John's University women's basketball team. She was inducted to the Suffolk Sports Hall of Fame in 2020.

Coaching career 
On May 7, 2002, Barnes was named the head coach at St. John's University. She was named the seventh head coach in the then 28-year history of the women's basketball program. She currently holds the record for most wins at the program and led the Red Storm to their first ever Sweet Sixteen appearance in the 2012 NCAA tournament.

During the 2017–18 season, she became the winningest coach in Michigan Wolverines women's basketball program history. She is the only coach in program history with six straight 20-win seasons. On July 12, 2018, Barnes Arico signed a contract extension with the Wolverines through the 2022–23 season. On September 10, 2021, Barnes Arico signed a contract extension with the Wolverines through the 2025–26 season. On December 28, 2022, with a victory over Nebraska, Barnes Arico won her 500th career game.

Personal life
Kim Barnes Arico is married to Larry Arico, and they have three children. They lived in Glen Rock, New Jersey when Kim was head coach at St. John's.

Head coaching record

References

External links 

 Michigan bio
 St. John's bio

1970 births
Living people
Adelphi Panthers women's basketball coaches
American women's basketball coaches
Basketball coaches from New Jersey
Basketball players from New Jersey
Michigan Wolverines women's basketball coaches
Montclair State Red Hawks women's basketball players
NJIT Highlanders women's basketball coaches
People from Glen Rock, New Jersey
Sportspeople from Bergen County, New Jersey
St. John's Red Storm women's basketball coaches
Stony Brook Seawolves women's basketball players
People from Mastic Beach, New York